Ichneumon tottor is a species of wasp in the genus Ichneumon. It is endemic to South Africa.

References

Insects described in 1822
Ichneumoninae